Rongchugiri was one of the 60 assembly constituencies of Meghalaya a north east state of India. Rongchugiri was also part of Tura (Lok Sabha constituency). It held its last election in 2008.

Member of Legislative Assembly
 1972: Medison A. Sangma, All Party Hill Leaders Conference
 1978: M. Reidson Momin, Indian National Congress
 1983: William Cecil Marak, All Party Hill Leaders Conference
 1993: Beckstar Sangma, Indian National Congress
 1998: Beckstar Sangma, Indian National Congress
 2003: Beckstar Sangma, Nationalist Congress Party
 2008: James Sangma, Nationalist Congress Party

See also
 Rongchugiri
 West Garo Hills district
 Tura (Lok Sabha constituency)

References

Former assembly constituencies of Meghalaya
West Garo Hills district